Harald Christian Lyngsaa (22 October 1917 – 9 December 1982) was a Danish footballer who played as a midfielder for Kjøbenhavns Boldklub and B.93. He made 14 appearances for the Denmark national team from 1940 to 1950.

References

External links
 
 

1917 births
1982 deaths
Danish men's footballers
Footballers from Copenhagen
Association football midfielders
Denmark international footballers
Denmark youth international footballers
Denmark under-21 international footballers
Kjøbenhavns Boldklub players
Boldklubben af 1893 players